Guanfacine, sold under the brand name Tenex among others, is an oral medication used to treat attention deficit hyperactivity disorder (ADHD) and high blood pressure. Guanfacine is FDA-approved for monotherapy treatment of ADHD as well as being used for augmentation of other treatments, such as stimulants. Guanfacine is also used off-label to treat tic disorders, anxiety disorders and PTSD.

Common side effects include sleepiness, constipation, and dry mouth. Other side effects may include low blood pressure and urinary problems. The FDA has categorized Guanfacine as "Category B"  in pregnancy which means animal-reproduction studies have not demonstrated a fetal risk or an adverse effect during pregnancy or breastfeeding. It appears to work by activating the α2A receptors in the brain thereby decreasing sympathetic nervous system activity.

Guanfacine was approved for medical use in the United States in 1986. It is available as a generic medication. In 2020, it was the 300th most commonly prescribed medication in the United States, with more than 1million prescriptions.

Medical uses

Guanfacine is FDA-approved as monotherapy or augmentation with stimulants to treat attention deficit hyperactivity disorder. It is also FDA approved to treat high blood pressure. Guanfacine can offer a synergistic enhancement of stimulants such as amphetamines and methylphenidate for treating ADHD, and in many cases can also help control the side effect profile of stimulant medications. Guanfacine is also used off-label to treat tic disorders, anxiety disorders, and PTSD.

An off-label use of guanfacine is for the treatment of anxiety, such as generalized anxiety disorder and post-traumatic stress disorder symptoms. Guanfacine and other α2A agonists have anxiolytic-like action, thereby reducing the emotional responses of the amygdala, and strengthening prefrontal cortical regulation of emotion, action and thought. These actions arise from both inhibition of stress-induced catecholamine release, and from prominent, post-synaptic actions in the prefrontal cortex. Due to its prolonged half-life, it also has been seen to improve sleep interrupted by nightmares in PTSD patients. All of these actions likely contribute to the relief of the hyperarousal, re-experiencing of memory, and impulsivity associated with PTSD. Guanfacine appears to be especially helpful in treating children who have been traumatized or abused.

Adverse effects
Side effects of guanfacine are dose-dependent.

Very common (>10% incidence) adverse effects include sleepiness, tiredness, headache, and stomach ache.

Common (1–10% incidence) adverse effects include decreased appetite, nausea, dry mouth, urinary incontinence, and rashes.

Typical side effects such as fatigue, irritability, and stomach upset can take a week or two to subside. Increases in dosage can have the same adjustment period.

Interactions 
Guanfacine availability is significantly affected by the CYP3A4 and CYP3A5 enzymes. Medications that inhibit or induce those enzymes change the amount of guanfacine in circulation and thus its efficacy and rate of adverse effects. Because of its impact on the heart, it should be used with caution with other cardioactive drugs. A similar concern is appropriate when it is used with sedating medications.

Guanfacine is known to lower the user's tolerance for alcohol, heightening its effect, and alcohol use may prolong the effects of the medication.

Pharmacology

Guanfacine is a highly selective agonist of the α2A adrenergic receptor, with low affinity for other receptors. However it may also be a potent 5-HT2B receptor agonist, which can be associated with valvulopathy, although not all 5-HT2B agonists have this effect.

Mechanism of action
Guanfacine works by activating α2A adrenoceptors within the central nervous system. This leads to reduced peripheral sympathetic outflow and thus a reduction in peripheral sympathetic tone, which lowers both systolic and diastolic blood pressure.

In ADHD, guanfacine works by strengthening the regulation of attention and behavior by the prefrontal cortex. These enhancing effects on prefrontal cortical functions are believed to be due to drug stimulation of post-synaptic α2A adrenoceptors on dendritic spines. cAMP-mediated opening of HCN and KCNQ channels is inhibited, which enhances prefrontal cortical synaptic connectivity and neuronal firing. The use of guanfacine for treating prefrontal disorders was developed by the Arnsten Lab at Yale University.

Pharmacokinetics
Guanfacine has an oral bioavailability of 80%. There is no clear evidence of any first-pass metabolism. Elimination half-life is 17 hours with the major elimination route being renal. The principal metabolite is the 3-hydroxy-derivative, with evidence of moderate biotransformation, and the key intermediate is an epoxide. Elimination is not impacted by impaired renal function. As such, metabolism by the liver is the assumption for those with impaired renal function, as supported by the increased frequency of known side effects of orthostatic hypotension and sedation.

History
In 1986, guanfacine was approved by the FDA for the treatment of hypertension under the brand name Tenex (Drugs@FDA). In 2010, guanfacine was approved by the FDA for the treatment of attention deficit hyperactivity disorder for people 6–17 years old. It was approved for ADHD by the European Medicines Agency under the name Intuniv in 2015. It was added to the Australian Pharmaceutical Benefits Scheme for the treatment of ADHD in 2018.

Brand names
Brand names include Tenex, Afken, Estulic, and Intuniv (an extended release formulation).

Research
Guanfacine has been studied as a treatment for post-traumatic stress disorder (PTSD). Evidence of efficacy in adults is limited, but one study found positive results in children with comorbid ADHD. It may be also useful in adult PTSD patients who do not respond to SSRIs.

Results of studies using guanfacine to treat Tourette's have been mixed.

Guanfacine has been investigated for treatment of withdrawal for opioids, ethanol, and nicotine. Guanfacine has been shown to help reduce stress-induced craving of nicotine in smokers trying to quit, which may involve strengthening of prefrontal cortex meditated self-control.

References

External links 
 

5-HT2B agonists
Acetamides
Acylguanidines
Alpha-2 adrenergic receptor agonists
Antihypertensive agents
Attention deficit hyperactivity disorder management
Chloroarenes
Takeda Pharmaceutical Company brands
Wikipedia medicine articles ready to translate